Alguazas is a municipality of Spain in the autonomous community and province of Murcia and it is located in the south-west of the northeastern quarter.

Geography 
The inhabitants are distributed in the following localities: Alguazas, which is located in the southeastern quarter and had a population of 9,108 in 2020; Las Pullas, which occurs in the north and was inhabited by 137 people; El Paraje, which occurs in the south-east and was home to 183 people; Lo Campoo, which population consisted of 48; El Colmenar, where 8 people lived; Los Pardos, which had a population of 109; and Torre Los Frailes, which was inhabited by 64 people.

Demographics 
13.728% inhabitants are foreigners – 2.018% come from other country of Europe, 9.03% are Africans, 2.32% are Americans and 0.297 are Asians. The table below shows the population trends in the 20th and 21st centuries:

Economy 
31.8% surface is utilised for crop grow purposes and the most widely grown products are the lemons, the peaches, the apricots and the tangerines.17.21% agreements were written for jobs in the agriculture and fishing sectors, 41.26% agreements emerged for jobs in the services sector, 36.649% were written for jobs in the industry sector in 2019 and 47.74% agreements were signed by labourers in manufacture industries in the first half of 2016.

Facilities

Healthcare 
A consultorio (primary care centre with the fewest functions) and a centro de salud (primary care centre) are located in the main town and another consultorio is placed in El Paraje.

Education 
An early childhood and primary education centre (CEIP), a primary and secondary education centre and a secondary education centre (IES) occur in the main town.

References 

Municipalities in the Region of Murcia